Mark Popovic (born October 11, 1982) is a Canadian former professional ice hockey defenceman.

Playing career
As a youth, Popovic played in the 1996 Quebec International Pee-Wee Hockey Tournament with the Toronto Young Nationals minor ice hockey team.

Popovic was drafted in the 2nd round of the 2001 NHL Entry Draft by the Mighty Ducks of Anaheim. He signed with the Atlanta Thrashers in 2005. Over the course of his North American career, Popovic appeared in 81 NHL games for 7 points.

On September 21, 2010, Popovic again left the NHL after a single season with the Thrashers and signed a one-year deal with HC Lugano of the Swiss National League A.

After three seasons in Switzerland on June 6, 2013, it was announced that he signed a free agent contract with Croatian team KHL Medveščak Zagreb of the KHL.

On June 21, 2015, Popovic left Croatia and signed a one-year contract with Austrian club, EC KAC in the EBEL.

Career statistics

Regular season and playoffs

International

References

External links

1982 births
Living people
Atlanta Thrashers players
Canadian ice hockey defencemen
Chicago Wolves players
Cincinnati Mighty Ducks players
Ice hockey people from Ontario
Sportspeople from Hamilton, Ontario
EC KAC players
HC Lugano players
KHL Medveščak Zagreb players
Anaheim Ducks draft picks
Mighty Ducks of Anaheim players
SCL Tigers players
SKA Saint Petersburg players
Toronto St. Michael's Majors players
Canadian expatriate ice hockey players in Austria
Canadian expatriate ice hockey players in Croatia
Canadian expatriate ice hockey players in Russia
Canadian expatriate ice hockey players in Switzerland